The Killer (Turkish: Katil) is a 1953 Turkish adventure film directed by Lütfi Akad and starring Ayhan Isik, Gülistan Güzey and Neriman Köksal.

Cast
 Ayhan Isik as Kemal  
 Gülistan Güzey as Nevin  
 Neriman Köksal as Süheyla  
 Muazzez Arçay as Huriye  
 Necla Sertel as Nermin  
 Zaruhi Degirmenci 
 Sevki Artun 
 Nubar Terziyan as Nuri  
 Riza Tüzün as Süleyman  
 Mualla Sürer as Çamasirhane Yöneticisi  
 Hamdi Sarligil as Hamdi  
 Fikri Çöze 
 Sadettin Erbil as Emniyet Sube Müdürü  
 Kemal Tözem as Hakim  
 Erkan Baydemir as Turhan 
 Fadil Garan as Tahir  
 Turan Seyfioglu as Muzaffer Durak

References

Bibliography
 Gönül Dönmez-Colin. The Routledge Dictionary of Turkish Cinema. Routledge, 2013.

External links
 

1953 films
1953 adventure films
1950s Turkish-language films
Turkish adventure films
Films directed by Lütfi Akad
Turkish black-and-white films